SS Castilian  was a ship sunk by German submarine SM U-61 off Ireland in 1917.

She was built in 1890 as the Umbilo for the Natal Direct Line that in the 1890s plied the route between Durban in South Africa and London, also calling at St Helena. Umbilo is a district of Durban, South Africa. It was on the Umbilo that Dinuzulu kaCetshwayo, King of the Zulus, and his party returned to Natal in 1898 after seven years exile on St Helena. The ship featured on a postage stamp of St Helena in 2004.

References

External links

1890 ships
Maritime incidents in 1917
Steamships of the United Kingdom
World War I shipwrecks in the Atlantic Ocean
Ships built on the River Tees
Ships sunk by German submarines in World War I
Ships of the Ellerman Lines